Robert Lindstedt and Jan-Lennard Struff were the reigning champions from when the tournament was last held in 2019, but chose not to participate this year.

Hubert Hurkacz and Jan Zieliński won the title, defeating Hugo Nys and Arthur Rinderknech in the final, 7–5, 6–3.

Seeds

Draw

Draw

References

External links
 Main Draw

Moselle Open - Doubles